The Polideportivo Islas Malvinas is an indoor arena located in Mar del Plata, Argentina which was built for the XII Pan American Games in 1995. It is qualified to host such sports as basketball, handball, volleyball and tennis, as well as to accommodate any type of show, convention and exhibition. In the city, it is mostly known for being the stage where Peñarol de Mar del Plata play their home games first division basketball and local levels.

It belongs to the Teodoro Bronzini sports compound.

The arena's name reflects Argentina's claims of sovereignty over the Falkland Islands (Islas Malvinas in Spanish).

Facilities 
The stadium is built in the Campo Municipal de Deportes of the city. It has an area of 1.3 has, of top international level. It has a sport area of 65 x 48 meters with floating floor 24 x 43 m

Provides a direct vehicular access to the center of the complex, allowing the convenience that emergency vehicles such as ambulances within reach in case of an emergency and also areas of storage, which allow easy entry of any element or equipment (such as: sound, lighting). Access to the public are 4 and access the pockets are 16 galleries, all with emergency exit systems, which provides maximum safety and flow for ingress and egress to the complex. All the infrastructure of health, gym locker rooms, food service and others, have special adaptations for disabled people. It is equipped with a heating and air renewal, four boards many changes, plus a network of 28 speakers. Until 2008 it had a video-wall, and was the only stadium in the country that has one, but the need to expand the number of seats for the performance of the Davis Cup had the video-wall removed to be replaced with more seats .

A major traffic area covered Edge is available to perform any kind of simultaneous events as gastronomy and wine tasting, exhibition and sale of products or others.

The stadium was originally allowed to accommodate 6,482 spectators. However, for the implementation of the 2008 Davis Cup, new seats were added. Currently, the stadium has 7,666 seats, although in peak condition (with spectators standing in doorways and sitting on the stairs) may have around 8,000 people. It also has VIP access to journalism, independent judges and players, conference room, shower facilities and complementary.

It is part of the "Teodoro Bronzini" Municipal Sports Park, a 35 hectares area with several sport venues, including the Estadio José María Minella, the Julio Polet Municipal Velodrome, the Pan American Field Hockey Stadium, the "Alberto Zorrilla" Natatorium, the "Justo Roman" Athletic stadium and the Patinódromo Municipal.

History 
Originally built for the XII Pan American Games in 1995, the Polideportivo Islas Malvinas has become a symbol and pride of the city maximum, because it's the only one with those characteristics. When completed the Pan American Games, it began to be used with different types of applications. One, perhaps the most has justified its existence, was to be the stage where the basketball team first division Peñarol de Mar del Plata is local (most of the year is this use). For a year, so has been in the same place his archrival, Quilmes Mar del Plata. However, Peñarol has its home-court advantage at this stage, almost seamless (there were two years when for economic reasons could not make use of facilities) since 1995.

In addition it is used for stage shows, concerts and recitals in the summer, taking advantage of the high season for the city, where most shows Buenos Aires moved to Mar del Plata.

Finally, it is clear that the stadium is usually the place where they develop international sports tournaments such as basketball, handball and volleyball, as well as religious conventions and exhibitions. Its large capacity and features of the first level have allowed over the years a great flexibility to develop various types of activities.

Currently, the event which gathers more people and on a regular basis is the 'Superclasico' basketballQuilmes-Peñarol, where the stadium is filled with fans and supporters and sometimes even sold out completely. On that day, you have big security operation to prevent violence between the two factions.

The stadium was chosen to host the final of the Davis Cup 2008 (Spain – Argentina) to be played from 21 to 23 November 2008. For this occasion, the capacity was extended to 9,800 spectators capacity to meet regulatory actions requiring the organization. However, after moving seats that were removed had been placed solely for the tournament, and the final capacity for all events is 7,666 spectators.

Events held

Sports 
1995 Pan American Games
1999 FIVB Volleyball World League Final Round
2002 FIVB Volleyball Men's World Championship
2003 Parapan American Games
2005 FIBA Under-21 World Championship 
2006 South American Games
2007, 2009 and 2011 Super 8 Tournament
2008 Davis Cup Final
2009 World Senior ITF Championships
2009–10 FIBA Americas League Final Four
FIBA Americas Championship 2011
2011 Men's Youth World Handball Championship
2013 FIVB Volleyball World League Final Round
2013 Pan American Men's Junior Handball Championship
2015 Summer Transplant Games

Concerts 
 Luis Miguel December 5, 2010 (Luis Miguel Tour).
 Ricky Martin September 14, 2011 (Música + Alma + Sexo World Tour), March 25, 2016 (One World Tour).
 Calle 13 October 30, 2011 (Entren Los Que Quieran Tour).
 Roxette April 28, 2012 (Charm School World Tour)
 Lali Espósito (Soy Tour) October 8, 2016

External links
 Official Davis Cup website Final Davis Cup 2008 Argentina vs Spain 1–3

Indoor arenas in Argentina
Buildings and structures completed in 1995
Buildings and structures in Mar del Plata
Sports venues in Buenos Aires Province
Tourist attractions in Mar del Plata
Basketball venues in Argentina
Volleyball venues in Argentina
Venues of the 1995 Pan American Games
Venues of the 2006 South American Games